Deep in the Shed is the second studio album by jazz pianist Marcus Roberts, a protégé of trumpet player Wynton Marsalis. The album features Roberts playing chords on his left hand and "somewhat dark improvisations that burst into fireworks less often than you'd expect" with his right hand. Roberts is backed by a seven-piece band on most of this album, a lineup which included Marsalis performing under the alias E. Dankworth.

Track listing
All songs written by Marcus Roberts.

 "Nebuchadnezzar" - 9:40
 "Spiritual Awakening" - 5:57
 "The Governor" - 5:40
 "Deep In The Shed" - 11:07
 "Mysterious Interlude" - 5:42
 "E. Dankworth" - 4:10

Personnel
 Marcus Roberts – piano
 Scotty Barnhart – trumpet
 Wynton Marsalis – trumpet
 Wycliffe Gordon – trombone
 Wessell Anderson – alto saxophone
 Herbert Harris – tenor saxophone
 Todd Williams – tenor saxophone
 Chris Thomas – bass guitar
 Reginald Veal – bass guitar
 Maurice Carnes – drums
 Herlin Riley – drums

References

1989 albums
Marcus Roberts albums
Novus Records albums